Adam Ross Moore (born May 8, 1984) is an American former professional baseball catcher. He played in Major League Baseball (MLB) for the Seattle Mariners, Kansas City Royals, San Diego Padres, Cleveland Indians and Tampa Bay Rays.

Moore was drafted by the Seattle Mariners in the sixth round of the 2006 Major League Baseball draft.

Amateur career

High school
He attended Mineola High School in Mineola, Texas where he played both baseball and football. He batted .517 with a school-record 18 home runs, 63 RBI and 42 runs as a senior, he was selected to the Texas High School Baseball Coaches Association 3A all-state team. He was also selected to the all-state team three times and named district Most Valuable Player as a junior and senior.

College
Moore played his junior college baseball at Northeast Texas Community College where he earned first team all-Texas Eastern Athletic Conference honors in two seasons and also earned Collegiate Baseball magazine national player of the week honors. He redshirted at University of Nebraska in 2005 and a year later attended University of Texas at Arlington where he was named the 2006 Southland Conference Newcomer of the Year and first team all-SLC selection.
He went on to hit .350 with 10hr 50Rbi's 89 hits 22-2B's 5-3B's

Professional career

Seattle Mariners
He combined to hit .281 with seven home runs and 33 RBIs in 228 at-bats in his split time between the Short-Season Everett Aqua Sox of the Northwest League and the Class-A Wisconsin Timber Rattlers of the Midwest League.

He finished third in the California League in RBIs with 102 and slugging percentage with a .543 clip. His 102 RBIs were second-most in the Mariners organization, while also finishing fifth with 22 home runs. Moore was named High Desert's Most Valuable Player by the Mariners. He was rated as the Mariners number 15 prospect by Baseball America. He participated in the Mariners 2007 Arizona Fall League.

He spent the entire  season with the Double-A West Tenn Diamond Jaxx. He batted .319 in 429 at-bats with 60 runs scored, 34 doubles, two triples, 14 home runs and 71 RBIs. He was named a Southern League All-Star. Moore was sixth in batting average and sixth in doubles. He hit only .091 in 11 at-bats in the playoffs and in the last game of the Diamond Jaxx playoff run fractured his left thumb. He was selected as West Tenn's MVP by the Mariners Player Development staff and named the number 19 prospect in the Southern League by Baseball America also selected by the publication as the Mariners number six prospect.

Moore started the season with the West Tenn Diamond Jaxx but was later promoted to the Tacoma Rainiers of the Pacific Coast League. Moore finished the  season batting a combined .287 with 12 home runs, 56 RBIs, 24 doubles in 118 games.

On September 13,  Moore was called up to the Seattle Mariners along with Tacoma teammates Matt Tuiasosopo and Garrett Olson. Moore was the only one of the three players called up that traveled from Sacramento, California, where Tacoma was eliminated from the Pacific Coast League playoffs against the Sacramento River Cats, to Arlington, Texas, where the Mariners were facing the Texas Rangers. Moore said this about the call-up:

Moore made his Major League debut on September 17, . He went 0-for-5 against the Chicago White Sox, a game that went into 14 innings. He played all 14 innings in that game and caught all 213 pitches that eight Mariners pitchers threw in the game.

Moore made the 25-man roster for the Mariners' 2010 campaign.  He split time with other Seattle Mariner catchers Rob Johnson, Josh Bard and others.

On the April 7, 2011, Moore sustained a meniscus tear to his right knee and was out for 2 months.

On March 6, 2012, Moore broke the third metacarpal in his right wrist blocking a ball behind the plate. An examination the next day revealed the break. This cost Moore a chance to make the roster at the start of 2012. He was outrighted off of the 40-man roster on July 1.

Kansas City Royals
The Kansas City Royals claimed Moore off of waivers on July 7, 2012. He played in 35 games for the Triple A affiliate Omaha Royals, posting a .296 average with 22 RBI. He appeared in four games for Kansas City after being called up in September, going 2-for-11. On November 20, 2012 the Royals designated Moore for assignment as they cleared room on the 40-man roster ahead of the Rule 5 draft. He was released on August 8, 2013.  On August 12, 2013, Moore was re-signed to a contract that will keep him within the Royals organization through 2014.

San Diego Padres
Moore was traded to the San Diego Padres on March 25, 2014. He was outrighted to the minors on November 3, 2014, and elected free agency.

Cleveland Indians
Moore signed a minor league deal with the Cleveland Indians on December 7, 2014. The Indians purchased his contract on September 23, 2015. He elected free agency on November 6, 2015. He re-signed with the Indians on November 19. He elected free agency on November 6, 2017.

Moore was outrighted to the Columbus Clippers on November 7, 2016. He elected free agency on November 8, 2016. The Indians re-signed Moore to a minor league contract with an invitation to spring training on January 31, 2017.

Tampa Bay Rays
On February 3, 2018, Moore signed a minor league contract with the Tampa Bay Rays. Moore was designated for assignment on July 25, 2018. He had his contract purchased again on August 31, 2018. The Rays outrighted him to the minors on November 1, 2018 and he elected free agency.

Texas Rangers
On February 14, 2019, Moore signed a minor-league contract with the Texas Rangers and was assigned to the Triple-A Nashville Sounds.

Kansas City Royals (Second Stint)
On August 7, 2019, Moore was traded to the Kansas City Royals in exchange for cash and was assigned to the Omaha Storm Chasers. He became a free agent following the 2019 season.

References

External links

1984 births
Living people
People from Longview, Texas
People from Mineola, Texas
Baseball players from Texas
Major League Baseball catchers
Seattle Mariners players
Kansas City Royals players
San Diego Padres players
Cleveland Indians players
Tampa Bay Rays players
Nebraska Cornhuskers baseball players
UT Arlington Mavericks baseball players
Everett AquaSox players
Wisconsin Timber Rattlers players
High Desert Mavericks players
West Tennessee Diamond Jaxx players
Tacoma Rainiers players
Omaha Storm Chasers players
El Paso Chihuahuas players
Peoria Javelinas players
Arizona League Padres players
Columbus Clippers players
Durham Bulls players
Nashville Sounds players
Peninsula Oilers players